Asian Pacific Children's Convention (APCC ) in Fukuoka, Japan, is a non-profit making organization which promotes peace and co-existence throughout the world under the theme "We are the BRIDGE: We connect dreams around the world".

The organization's main event is the annual convention where over 300 children from Asia Pacific countries are invited to the city of Fukuoka in Japan with the intention of promoting inter cultural understanding and friendship.

APCC was established in November 1988 and the inaugural convention was run as part of the Asia-Pacific Expo, "Yokatopia", the commemorative event to celebrate the 100th anniversary of the founding of Fukuoka City.  Since then the summer invitation program has been held annually in Fukuoka and in 2008 the 20th anniversary of APCC was celebrated.

Objectives

The main objectives of APCC are:
To carry out a project encouraging exchange between children from the Asian-Pacific region.
To generate appreciation for the cultures of other nations and regions, with the aim of promoting mutual understanding and friendship.
To nurture international awareness in young people.
To realize world peace and co-existence through these activities.

The Programme

Each year up to 6 children (3 boys and 3 girls), all aged 11 and accompanied by a chaperone, from over 40 countries in the Asia-Pacific region are invited for the annual convention held in Fukuoka in July, during the Japanese summer.  The selection of the children is conducted by the liaison office appointed in each country (often a city council, education related ministry or a consulate).

These children, referred to as 'Junior Ambassadors' (JA's), all spend a week together in 'Marine House' where they get to experience many activities.  They have an opportunity to understand different cultures and make long lasting international friendships during this time.

Each JA also spends a week with a Japanese family in a homestay situation, literally becoming a member of the family.  These host families live in the Fukuoka Prefecture and they volunteer to be a part of this APCC program.  This is a great opportunity for the child to experience Japanese culture, Japanese school-life, and the friendliness and hospitality of the Japanese people. The JA has the opportunity to experience many aspects of Japanese life such as schooling, travel, visit tourist sites and shopping.

Mission project
Groups of Japanese children visit other APCC member countries to experience their different cultures to gain new experiences as in the convention.  During a Mission Project, they stay mostly with former APCC participants' families, which is similar to the home-stay program at APCC.  As in APCC where the Junior Ambassadors get to participate in various activities, these children also get such opportunities to establish and strengthen their friendships.

Other sub projects

Exchange Project - Promoting cultural exchange between foreign children who participate in the invitation project.
Support Project - Promoting Bridge Club to improve exchange between APCC participants.
Information sharing project - Holding various events such as symposiums and forums where the participants can share their knowledge and experiences.
Human Resource Development Project - To recruit volunteers and work actively with them to increase their awareness of others' needs and to continue ongoing education for previous APCC volunteers to equip them with the skills required for leadership.

Bridge Club (BC)
Bridge Club was formed in 1998 at the 10th anniversary of the APCC to establish a worldwide network of APCC participants.  All APCC participants automatically become members of Bridge Club.  Bridge Club Japan was initially formed and then followed on by some more other countries.

Objectives of a Bridge Club

The main objectives of a Bridge Club are:
To foster leaders with a global perspective who will shape the world in the future.
To build a network of "Global Citizens" free from religious, political and economic restrictions.
To expand this network across the world, establish a circle of friendship and work towards creating a peaceful society.

In order to achieve these goals, the Bridge Club reaches out beyond the limits of the APCC to form a human network around the world through its local BC activities.  Each BC has their own activities depending on local needs.  For example, humanitarian assistance, cultural exchange, intercultural education and training for JAs, and etcetera.  The Bridge Club also acts as an alumni association for former participants of the APCC, enabling them to keep in touch and sustain their friendships throughout the world.

At the 10th anniversary of the APCC, 69 of the former participants of the convention (Junior Ambassadors) were invited back to participate in it.  Since then every year some selected former JAs from some countries are invited as "Peace Ambassadors".  Their main responsibility is to carry on with the projects of BRIDGE CLUBs and to guide and assist the Junior Ambassadors.

A brief history

References

External links

http://www.apcc.gr.jp/e/whatsapcc/index.html
http://www.facebook.com/group.php?gid=15545949482
http://www.bcio.org/
Asian Pacific Children's Convention at Japan-America Society of Hawaii (JASH) website.

Organizations established in 1988
Peace organizations based in Japan